Doto kekoldi is a species of sea slug, a nudibranch, a marine gastropod mollusc in the family Dotidae.

Distribution
This species was described from the eastern or Caribbean Sea coast of Costa Rica.

Description
The body of this nudibranch is black with paler grey areas at the base of the cerata. The cerata are very irregular in shape. There are well-developed pseudobranchs arising from the inner faces of the cerata.

The maximum recorded body length is 12 mm.

Ecology
Minimum recorded depth is 9 m. Maximum recorded depth is 9 m.

Doto kekoldi is found associated with the hydroid Eudendrium sp. which is presumably its prey.

References

External links

Dotidae
Gastropods described in 2001